Calvino usually refers to Italo Calvino, an Italian writer.

Calvino may also refer to:

Calvino (crater)
Calvino (surname)

See also
Calvino Noir, a video game
Calviño, a surname